This is a list of inactive volcanoes in the Philippines. Volcanoes with no record of eruptions are considered as extinct or inactive. Their physical form since their last activity has been altered by agents of weathering and erosion with the formation of deep and long gullies. Inactive does not necessarily indicate the volcano will not erupt again. Mount Pinatubo had no recorded historical eruption before its cataclysmic 1991 eruption.

The Philippine Institute of Volcanology and Seismology (PHIVOLCS) currently lists 355 volcanoes in the Philippines as inactive. The PHIVOLCS listing is the basis of this list, but with additional information, some were reclassified in the active list or the potentially active list. Volcanoes with solfataric or fumarolic activity indicating active magma supply such as Pocdol Mountains, are placed in the List of potentially active volcanoes in the Philippines. This list shows 339 inactive volcanoes in the Philippines, listed by volcanic region.

Luzon

Visayas

Sulu Archipelago / Zamboanga Peninsula

Mindanao

See also 
 List of active volcanoes in the Philippines
 List of potentially active volcanoes in the Philippines
 List of mountains in the Philippines

Notes

References

External links
PHIVOLCS Volcano Monitoring

Volcanoes
Philippines, inactive
Inactive
Volcanism of the Philippines